The 42nd Biathlon World Championships were held in Östersund, Sweden from 8 to 17 February 2008. It was the second time Östersund was hosting the Biathlon World Championships, the first being in 1970. It was also 50 years after the first Biathlon World Championships, which were held 1958 in Saalfelden, Austria.

There were a total of 11 competitions: sprint, pursuit, individual, mass start, and relay races for men and women, and the relatively new mixed relay. The championships were dominated by the German, Norwegian, and Russian teams, which would win every competition and 28 of the 33 available medals.

Schedule

Medal winners

Men

Women

Mixed

Medal summary

References

External links

Östersund 2008 - official website

2008
International sports competitions hosted by Sweden
Biathlon World Championships
Biathlon competitions in Sweden
2008 in Swedish sport
Sports competitions in Östersund
February 2008 sports events in Europe